Outland is a 1981 science fiction thriller film written and directed by Peter Hyams and starring Sean Connery, Peter Boyle, and Frances Sternhagen.

Set on Jupiter's moon Io, it has been described as a space Western, and bears thematic resemblances to the 1952 film High Noon.

The film follows a new Marshal who starts work at a mining facility on Io.  There he discovers a dirty secret but runs into dead ends as he tries to uncover those behind it, who also attempt to silence him.

Plot
Federal Marshal William O'Niel is assigned to a tour of duty at the titanium ore mining outpost Con-Am 27, operated by the company Con-Amalgamate on the Jovian moon of Io. Conditions on Io are difficult; gravity is 1/6 that of Earth's with no breathable atmosphere, and the spacesuits are cumbersome with limited air. Shifts are long but significant bonuses are paid. The general manager, Mark Sheppard, boasts that productivity has broken all records since he took over. Carol, O'Niel's wife, feels she cannot raise their son Paul on Io and leaves with their child to the Jupiter space station to await a shuttle back to Earth. Tarlow, a miner, suffers an attack of stimulant psychosishe sees spiders and rips open his spacesuitresulting in death by explosive decompression. Cane, another miner, enters an elevator without his spacesuit during another psychotic episode and dies from decompression. With the reluctant assistance of Dr. Lazarus, O'Niel investigates the deaths.

Another incident involves a worker, Sagan, who takes a prostitute hostage and threatens to kill her with a knife. O'Niel attempts to calm the man while Montone, his sergeant, sneaks in via the air duct and kills Sagan with a shotgun. O'Niel and Lazarus discover that Sagan had traces of polydichloric euthimal, a powerful amphetamine-type drug in his bloodstream, which would allow the miners to work continuously for days at a time until they burn out and turn psychotic after approximately ten months of use. O'Niel uncovers a drug distribution ring run by a corrupt Sheppard and sanctioned by now repentant Montone.

Using surveillance cameras, O'Niel finds and captures Nicholas Spota, one of Sheppard's dealers, who is murdered before he can be questioned. Montone is found garrotted.  In a meat locker, O'Niel finds the latest shipment of drugs, which was shipped from the space station. He is then attacked there by another dealer, Russell Yario. O'Niel knocks him out, then destroys the shipment of drugs. When Sheppard finds out, he threatens O'Niel and contacts his drug distributor, asking him to send in professional hitmen. O'Niel is prepared, having been monitoring Sheppard's communications.

O'Niel waits for the arrival of the hitmen on a supply shuttle from the other side of Jupiter. Realizing what is coming and with only Dr. Lazarus willing to help him, O'Niel sends a message to his family promising to return to Earth when his "job is done". O'Niel ambushes the hitmen one by one. Lazarus helps him kill the first by trapping him in a pressurized corridor; O'Niel activates a bomb, causing an explosive decompression that kills the hitman. The second is killed in a glass greenhouse structure of the outpost when O'Niel tricks him into shooting a window, causing it to break open and blow him out to his death by explosive decompression.

O'Niel is then confronted and attacked by Sheppard's inside man - one of his own deputies, Sgt. Ballard. The two fight outside the outpost near the satellite structure until O'Niel pulls Ballard's oxygen hose, suffocating him as he pushes him into an electrical generation station, vaporizing him on impact. O'Niel then confronts the surprised Sheppard inside the outpost's recreation bar, knocking him out with one punch. It is implied Sheppard will now be brought to justice or murdered by his own associates. O'Niel, however, has already contacted his superiors about Sheppard's associates, some of whom are Con-Am executives, and shortly before his departure receives a communication that warrants have been issued for their arrests. O'Niel bids farewell to Lazarus and leaves on the shuttle to join his wife and son on the journey back to Earth.

Cast

Production

Development
Hyams recalled, I wanted to do a Western. Everybody said, 'You can't do a Western; Westerns are dead; nobody will do a Western'. I remember thinking it was weird that this genre that had endured for so long was just gone. But then I woke up and came to the conclusion – obviously after other people – that it was actually alive and well, but in outer space. I wanted to make a film about the frontier. Not the wonder of it or the glamour of it: I wanted to do something about Dodge City and how hard life was. I wrote it, and by great fortune Sean Connery wanted to do it. And how many chances do you get to work with Sean Connery?
The film was developed at Universal by Hyams and producer Richard Roth. Universal turned it down then Roth, who had a development deal at 20th Century Fox under Alan Ladd Jr, took the project to Ladd's new company, The Ladd Company.

Outland was filmed at Pinewood Studios, Iver Heath, Buckinghamshire, UK, with an initial budget of $12 million.

The film's working title was "Io" after the setting of the film. This was later changed because many people read it as the number 10, or "Lo" ("low"). Principal photography took place starting with the miniature models in May 1980 and with the actors beginning in June 1980. Post-production for the film was completed in February 1981.

Outland was pioneering as the first motion picture to use Introvision, a variation on front projection that allows foreground, mid-ground and background elements to be combined in the camera, as opposed to using optical processes such as bluescreen matting. This enabled characters to convincingly walk around miniature sets of the mining colony.

Soundtrack
The music to Outland was composed and conducted by veteran composer Jerry Goldsmith, who had previously worked with writer/director Peter Hyams on the science fiction thriller Capricorn One (1978) and had recently provided the soundtrack to Alien (which had a similar style to Outland, reflecting isolation, remoteness and fear). The soundtrack to Outland has been released three times on disc; 19 November 1993 through GNP Crescendo (with his score to Capricorn One), June 2000 through Warner Music Group, and a two-disc extended edition released 15 June 2010 through Film Score Monthly. The expanded release also includes the John Williams music for the Ladd Company logo, the material composed by Morton Stevens for the fight between O'Niel and Ballard and the source cues for the rec room by Michael Boddicker.

The distributed 35mm film prints have Dolby Stereo audio and the 70mm Anamorphic Blow-Up film prints featured Six-Track Dolby Stereo audio. All 70mm prints were encoded for a Megasound option, in which theaters needed to be outfitted with more speakers and sound equipment. Outland was one of four films released by Warner Bros. to officially make use of their Megasound movie theater sound system, in the early 1980s.

Reception

Box office
The film received mixed reviews and box office reception when it was released. It opened strongly with $3,059,638 in weekend box office receipts in the U.S. According to the New York Times on its opening weekend the film was "sensational in Los Angeles and on New York's East Side" but "played poorly in many small cities. By platforming Outland – opening it in less than 350 theaters to allow it to build an audience rather slowly – the company gambled that the movie would appeal to ticketbuyers; the picture will be in trouble if it drops off at the box office this weekend."

Total estimated box offices receipts in the country wound up being between $17,374,595 and $20,000,000, just above its $16 million budget.

Awards
The film was nominated for the Academy Award for Best Sound (John Wilkinson, Robert W. Glass Jr., Robert Thirlwell and Robin Gregory).

Critical
Gary Arnold at The Washington Post had this to say: "In Outland, writer-director Peter Hyams has adapted the plot of High Noon to an intriguing sci-fi environment—a huge titanium mine located on Io, a volcanic moon of Jupiter. But the conventions that worked for High Noon break down in the high-tech atmosphere of Outland and the story seems trite and dinky".

In The Boston Globe, Michael Blowen was more favorable: "The parallels between Outland and Fred Zinneman's 1952 western High Noon are apparent. Writer-director Peter Hyams has transported the characters and motifs from the dusty frontier town of Gary Cooper to the frontiers of space. While Hyams keeps the story barreling along, he also develops a corollary anti-capitalist theme. Io is an outpost for exploitation, and it doesn't make any difference whether the miners are digging gold in the Colorado hills or titanium on Jupiter's moon, the greed of the corporate class will prevail. Outland marks the return of the classic western hero in a space helmet. His outfit has changed and his environment has expanded but he's still the same. When Connery stares down the barrel of that shotgun, you'd better smile".

Desmond Ryan at The Philadelphia Inquirer called it: "A brilliant sci-fi Western. In many ways, Hyams has made a film that is more frightening than Alien, because he surmises that space will change us very little and the real monsters we are liable to encounter will be in the next space suit."

Christopher John reviewed Outland in Ares Magazine #10 and commented that "Outland is a good movie, and not just for science fiction fans. Its success will undoubtedly inspire a few tired, low-grade imitations. Hopefully, it will inspire a few more solid, interesting and entertaining films as well."

David Harkin at Taste of Cinema suggested that 'Outland is a perfect example of Sean Connery in transition from leading man to older statesman of Hollywood'.

On Rotten Tomatoes, Outland holds a rating of 54% from 28 reviews.

Home media
Outland was first released for home video on VHS, Beta, and V2000 videotape formats in November 1982. The film had many re-issues on VHS and between 1982 and 1998, including a widescreen NTSC VHS on 7 January 1997. Videodisc releases included the CED disc in August 1983, a Laserdisc release in 1984, and a remastered laserdisc with digital sound on 28 August 1991.

Outland was released on DVD on 18 November 1997. It was presented in both letterbox widescreen and full screen on a double sided disc with the soundtrack remastered in Dolby 5.1 surround sound. The Region 1 DVD received harsh criticism for its poor quality transfer, and absence of enhancement for widescreen televisions. A "making of" featurette, cast and credit notes, plus a theatrical trailer are included as special features on the disc. The film was released on DVD in the UK (Region 2) in 1998. This version is anamorphically enhanced for widescreen televisions, as is the Region 4 release. Outland was released on Blu-ray Disc on 10 July 2012. The film is presented in an aspect ratio of 2.40:1 with an English DTS-HD Master Audio 5.1 surround sound mix. The disc also features a brand new commentary audio-track with the director Peter Hyams.

North American airings

Pay television
Outland debuted on pay TV in the U.S. in September 1982 on the HBO and Showtime channels. In Canada, the film was first shown in October 1983 on Superchannel. The film was broadcast uncut, commercial-free, and periodically over several months, in both countries. These pay TV broadcasts of Outland used the same source as the initial NTSC home video release.

Network television
The network TV premiere for Outland was on 19 May 1984 via CBS in the U.S. and was simulcasted on CTV in Canada. This re-edited version of the film, broadcast exclusively on these networks, utilized cut footage not seen in the theatrical/home video version. One notable example is an extended scene showing a more lengthy exit from the station for O'Niel and also Ballard near the end of the film suited-up while exiting; these cutting-room-floor scenes were made available for the network to extend parts of the film which allowed them to sell more commercial slots to advertisers. The inclusion of left-over footage (if made available) was common practice during the 1970s to 1980s, for network film premieres and subsequently licensed broadcasts. This version was labeled "edited for television" to comply with U.S. network television censorship standards of the time and never released to home video.

Adaptations
 A comic strip adaptation of Outland illustrated by Jim Steranko appeared in Heavy Metal magazine in the July 1981 to October 1981, and January 1982 issues.
 A novelization of Outland written by Alan Dean Foster was published by Warner Books in March 1981.
 A large-format photonovel titled Outland: The Movie Novel: Edited by Richard J. Anobile from the Screenplay by Peter Hyams was published by Grand Central Publishing in 1981. It was promoted as including "over 750 full-color photographs".
 A song based on Outland called "High Moon" was written by Star One (a side project of Ayreon composer Arjen Lucassen) for the Space Metal album.
 On 18 August 2009, Warner Bros. announced that director Michael Davis had been hired to direct a remake of the film from a script by Chad St. John. No casting or start date information was announced.

See also
 Explosive decompression myth
 Moon (2009 film)

References

External links
 
 
 
 

1981 films
1980s science fiction action films
1980s dystopian films
1980s Western (genre) science fiction films
British Western (genre) science fiction films
1980s English-language films
Films scored by Jerry Goldsmith
Films adapted into comics
Films directed by Peter Hyams
Films shot at Pinewood Studios
Fiction set on Io (moon)
Jupiter in film
Films about mining
British science fiction action films
Films with screenplays by Peter Hyams
British space adventure films
Space Western films
The Ladd Company films
1980s British films